Hide-A-Way Hills is a census-designated place (CDP) in Fairfield and Hocking counties in the U.S. state of Ohio. As of the 2010 census, the community had 688 residential units and a year-round population of 794.

History
Hide-A-Way Hills was founded in 1961 as a planned community. The original developer, Hide-A-Way Hills, Inc., controlled the development and the facilities of Hide-A-Way Hills until 1973.

In 1965, construction began on a dam that would create the  Lake of the Four Seasons. The dam cost about $500,000 and was completed in 1966. Five years after the completion of the dam, a marina, beach and playground were built on the north side of the lake.

The residents of Hide-A-Way Hills created a non-profit club in 1972, and on February 21, 1973, the club assumed ownership from the original developer. It was decided that the club would be operated by a nine-member Board of Trustees.

The community expanded its boundaries in 2004, when a  property adjacent to the community was offered for sale. The club purchased it in March of that year.

Geography
Hide-A-Way Hills is located in northern Hocking County and southeastern Fairfield County, surrounding Lake of the Four Seasons and several smaller lakes to the east, including Lake Eagle Claw, the easternmost. The lakes are built on several tributaries of Rush Creek, which in turn is a tributary of the Hocking River, which flows south to the Ohio River. About two-thirds of the community lies in northwestern Marion Township in Hocking County, while the remainder is in southern Rushcreek Township in Fairfield County.

Demographics

References

External links
Hide-A-Way Hills Club

Census-designated places in Fairfield County, Ohio
Census-designated places in Hocking County, Ohio
Populated places established in 1961
1961 establishments in Ohio